Linda Briceño is a Venezuelan songwriter, trumpeter, producer and vocalist. She was awarded Producer of the Year at the 19th Annual Latin Grammy Awards, becoming the first woman ever to win the award.

Briceño grew up in Caracas, Venezuela, studying classical percussion and trumpet in El Sistema, an education program which also produced Gustavo Dudamel, Diego Matheuz, and Pedro Eustache. Under the mentorship of Mireya Cisneros, Alberto Vollmer, Juan Luis Guerra, and Arturo Sandoval, Briceño relocated to New York City in 2013.

In 2014, Briceño released Tiempo, landing herself Latin Grammy nominations for Best New Artist and Traditional Pop Vocal Album. In 2018, released the single "Eleven" under the name Ella Bric and the Hidden Figures, as well as producing MV Caldera's album Segundo Piso.

References 

Venezuelan women musicians
Trumpeters
Living people
Latin Grammy Award winners
Latin Grammy Award for Producer of the Year
Venezuelan record producers
Venezuelan women record producers
Year of birth missing (living people)
Women trumpeters
Women in Latin music
Latin music record producers